Oscar Massey (born 14 January 2004) is an English professional footballer who plays as a forward for  club Swindon Town.

Career
Massey started his career at his hometown club, Truro City, before joining Plymouth Argyle's youth system. He made his senior professional debut, aged 17, starting and playing 69 minutes of Plymouth's 2-0 defeat at Newport County in an EFL Trophy group stage game on 31 August 2021.

He moved to Swindon Town in June 2022. He made his Swindon debut the following month in the 2-0 EFL Cup loss against Walsall on 9 August 2022.

During the 2022/23 season, Massey spent time out on loan with Hungerford Town and Wantage Town.

Career statistics

References

External links

2004 births
Living people
English footballers
Association football forwards
Swindon Town F.C. players
English Football League players